Kava Darreh (also Romanized as Kavā Darreh and Kevā Darreh) is a village in Ashrestaq Rural District, Yaneh Sar District, Behshahr County, Mazandaran Province, Iran. At the 2006 census, its population was 39, in 13 families.

References 

Populated places in Behshahr County